Ernest Arthur Hart (3 January 1902 – 21 July 1954) was English footballer who played for Leeds United, Mansfield Town, Tunbridge Wells Rangers and the England national team in the 1930s.

Football career
Hart was born in Overseal, Derbyshire, and showed great promise in Overseal schoolboy and junior football, and later with a side in Doncaster named Woodlands Wesleyans. His performances brought him to the attention of League club scouts, and in September 1920 he signed for Leeds United. Over the next sixteen seasons he was a first team regular at Elland Road, and was widely recognised as one of the best centre-halves in the game.

Hart earned eight England caps between 1928 and 1934, including an appearance in the England team that beat Austria 4–3 in 1932 - the Austria side of the early 1930s were regarded as Continental Europe's strongest side, and had gone 14 matches unbeaten when they met England. His international career should have been longer, but he lost his England place as a result of a ban imposed for swearing at a referee. He played for the "Professionals" in the 1929 FA Charity Shield.

In total, Hart made 472 appearances for Leeds, and scored 15 goals.

Between 1936 and 1938 he played for Mansfield Town, then became player manager at Tunbridge Wells Rangers where he stayed until the club folded early in the Second World War on 12 January 1940.

After football
On retirement, he bought a bus and began a coach business based in Doncaster as E.A.Hart, which traded as the Beehive Bus Company, this prospered and later was purchased by Wilfreda Coaches soon after they moved to the new HQ at Adwick-le-Street, Doncaster. The joint company trades as Wilfreda Beehive, a luxury coach company operating from Doncaster and now nationally known.

He died on 21 July 1954, aged 52. In a poll of the 100 greatest ever Leeds United players, Hart was voted in at number 76.

References

1902 births
People from Overseal
Footballers from Derbyshire
1954 deaths
English footballers
England international footballers
Leeds United F.C. players
Mansfield Town F.C. players
Tunbridge Wells F.C. players
English Football League players
English Football League representative players
Association football central defenders